Vijay Harish Chandra Patel (born 27 April 1960, in Ahmedabad) is an Indian lawyer and a former member of parliament. He graduated with a bachelor's degree in Chemical Engineering from DDIT Nadiad and LL.B. from Sir L.A. Shah Law College, Ahmedabad (Gujarat).

He was elected to eleventh Lok Sabha from Gandhinagar (Lok Sabha constituency) in 1996 being a Bhartiya Janta Party candidate defeating Super Star Rajesh Khanna. He. was also elected to tenth Gujarat Legislative Assembly in the year 1998 being Bhartiya Janta Party candidate.

He defended Narendra Modi Government in Gujarat Assembly in 2002.  He criticised the statements made by the national human rights commission chairman justice j s verma holding the state government responsible for the violence and further stated that even when the k g shah commission is probing the circumstances that led to the communal disturbances in the aftermath of godhra train massacre. He further stated that it was really shocking that the justice addressed news conferences and spoke to the electronic media in flagrant violation of the normal practice of the quasi-judicial officials of keeping away from publicity.

He was elected as the Chairman of Bar Council of Gujarat in the year 2008–2009. He is elected as The Chairman, Executive Committee, Bar Council of Gujarat. He had been also I/c. Editor of a Law Journal viz. Gujarat Law Herald being published by Bar Council of Gujarat. He was President of Gujarat High Court Advocates' Association in the year 2012-13 & 2013–2014. He was felicitated by Outstanding Alumnus Award by DD University in the year 2007–2008.

References

Living people
India MPs 1996–1997
1960 births
Lok Sabha members from Gujarat
Politicians from Ahmedabad
Gujarat MLAs 1998–2002
Bharatiya Janata Party politicians from Gujarat
Dharamsinh Desai University alumni